Gordon Kipping (born 1966) is the founder and principal of G TECTS, a New York-based architectural firm. Kipping has taught at the Graduate School of Design at Harvard University and has assisted Frank Gehry in teaching design studios at the School of Architecture at Yale University. Kipping has been a studio professor at the School of Architecture at Columbia University, since 2000.

Life and works 

Kipping is a native of Toronto, Ontario who has been living and working in New York City since 1995.  Upon completing a Bachelor of Applied Science degree in engineering in 1989 at the University of Toronto, Gordon Kipping worked as a mechanical engineer in building services, eventually attaining licensure as a professional engineer in 1993.  In 1991, he returned to school to study architecture at the Southern California Institute of Architecture where he received a Master of Architecture degree in 1995.  Since graduation, Kipping has worked for the offices of Philip Johnson, Greg Lynn, Pei Cobb Freed & Partners and Davis Brody Bond.  Coinciding with his employment in architectural offices, Kipping produced conceptual and built work under the name G Tects, holding a solo exhibition at StoreFront For Art and Architecture entitled "Residual Urban Site Strategies," (1998) and authored a book entitled Ordinary Diagrams:  Electronic Information Technologies and Architecture, (1995 & 1997).  The book was cited in the Terence Riley essay "The Un-Private House" accompanying the Museum of Modern Art show of the same name.  Comparisons were drawn between the overexposure produced by glass in the Mies van der Rohe Farnsworth House and the similar effect in a G Tects-proposed house as facilitated by electronic information technologies.  The book and a print edition of its final plate "Entity as Information Zoom" are in the collection of the Museum of Modern Art and were on display in the exhibition "Cut ‘n’ Paste:  From Architectural Assemblage to Collage City."
One of Kipping's most notable and published projects is the Tribeca Issey Miyake store he designed in cooperation with Frank Gehry. Kipping said he tried to ‘push accepted norms into new places.’ with this project which was completed in 2001. The shop occupies three floors of a restored 1888 warehouse on Hudson Street, with gridded stainless steel walls and diagonally striped glass floors.
In 2016, G Tects was selected by the New York City Department of Design and Construction to be part of their Design Excellence program, shortlisting them for public projects in New York. Kipping has an extensive client list that includes Issey Miyake, The National Jazz Museum of Harlem, Lincoln Center, Forest City Ratner, City University of New York and the New York City Department of Design and Construction.

Awards 

2008, Miyake Madison, Lumen Award of Merit, Illuminating Engineering Society 2008 Lighting Design Awards
2006, G TECTS, New Practices New York: Six Young Firms Set Themselves Apart, AIA New York Chapter & The Architect’s Newspaper
2003, Gordon Kipping, Creative Spirit Award, Black Alumni of Pratt 2003 Celebration of Creative Spirit
2002, Issey Miyake Tribeca Boutique, Showroom & Headquarters, Interior Architecture Award, AIA New York Chapter 2002 Design Awards

References

External links 
 http://gtects.com/
 La Ferla, Ruth. ‘Noticed; Let Me Guess: You Must Be An Architect’. nytimes.com. The New York Times.
 Cohen, Patricia. ‘When a Museum’s Big Dreams Prove Too Ambitious’. nytimes.com. The New York Times.

1966 births
Living people
American architects
Canadian architects
University of Toronto alumni
People from Toronto
Southern California Institute of Architecture alumni
Columbia University faculty